Euclidean theorem may refer to:
Any theorem in Euclidean geometry
Any theorem in Euclid's Elements, and in particular:
Euclid's theorem that there are infinitely many prime numbers
Euclid's lemma, also called Euclid's first theorem, on the prime factors of products
The Euclid–Euler theorem characterizing the even perfect numbers
Geometric mean theorem about right triangle altitude

See also
Euclidean (disambiguation)
Euclid (disambiguation)